Belveric Benton Bean (April 25, 1905 – June 1, 1988) was a Major League Baseball pitcher who played for five seasons. Nicknamed "Bill", he played for the Cleveland Indians from 1930 to 1935 and the Washington Senators in 1935.

External links

1905 births
1988 deaths
Cleveland Indians players
Washington Senators (1901–1960) players
Major League Baseball pitchers
Baseball players from Texas
People from Mills County, Texas
Augusta Tygers players
Chattanooga Lookouts players
Fort Worth Cats players
Kansas City Blues (baseball) players
Minneapolis Millers (baseball) players
New Orleans Pelicans (baseball) players
Okmulgee Drillers players
Toledo Mud Hens players